Ettrick Pen is a hill in the Ettrick Hills range, part of the Southern Uplands of Scotland. A remote peak, It lies southwest of the village of Ettrick, on the border of the Scottish Borders and Dumfries and Galloway. The highest of the Ettrick Hills, it is crossed by the Southern Upland Way and is a prominent landmark from many directions. Its summit is topped by an ancient cairn.

References

Marilyns of Scotland
Grahams
Donald mountains
Mountains and hills of Dumfries and Galloway
Mountains and hills of the Scottish Borders